The 1940 United States presidential election in New Jersey took place on November 5, 1940. All contemporary 48 states were part of the 1940 United States presidential election. Voters chose 16 electors to the Electoral College, which selected the president and vice president.

New Jersey was won by the Democratic nominees, incumbent President Franklin D. Roosevelt of New York and his running mate Secretary of Agriculture Henry A. Wallace of Iowa. Roosevelt and Wallace defeated the Republican nominees, corporate lawyer Wendell Willkie of New York and his running mate Senate Minority Leader Charles L. McNary of Oregon. 

Roosevelt narrowly carried New Jersey with 51.55 percent of the vote to Willkie’s 47.93 percent, a margin of 3.62 percent. Reflecting the closeness of the statewide result, Roosevelt and Willkie virtually split the state's 21 counties: Roosevelt won 11 counties to Willkie's ten. Roosevelt edged out Willkie statewide with decisive victories in some of the most heavily populated parts of the state, while keeping the results close in heavily populated counties that he lost. 

In North Jersey, Roosevelt maintained his dominance in heavily populated Hudson County, part of the New York metropolitan area where the New Deal Coalition was very strong, breaking 60% of the vote in the county for the third election in a row. Roosevelt also won heavily populated Middlesex County with more than 60% of the vote, along with majorities in Mercer County, Passaic County, and rural Warren County. Willkie won the remaining counties of North Jersey, breaking sixty percent of the vote in Bergen County and Morris County.

Roosevelt performed much more strongly overall in South Jersey, winning majorities in 6 out of 8 of the southernmost counties in the state; his strongest county win there was urban Camden County, where he broke 60% of the vote. In South Jersey, Willkie won only rural Cape May County. Besides his victories in North Jersey, Willkie also won Monmouth County and Ocean County in the central portion of the state. 

New Jersey by 1940 had become a closely divided swing state with a Republican lean, and its results in 1940 adhered to that pattern. Roosevelt had carried the state in the midst of both of his preceding nationwide landslides, although only by a very narrow margin in 1932. As Roosevelt decisively won re-election to an unprecedented third term, carrying 38 out of 48 states, his narrow margin of victory in New Jersey made the state about 6 points more Republican than the national average.

Results

Results by county

See also
 Presidency of Franklin D. Roosevelt
 United States presidential elections in New Jersey

References

New Jersey
1940
1940 New Jersey elections